OLA Girls Senior High School may refer to:

 OLA Girls Senior High School (Kenyasi), Ghana
 OLA Girls Senior High School (Ho), Ghana

See also
 Ola High School (disambiguation)